Apsoda was a town of ancient Bithynia, inhabited in Byzantine times. 

Its site is located south of Çatak, Asiatic Turkey.

References

Populated places in Bithynia
Former populated places in Turkey
Populated places of the Byzantine Empire
History of Bolu Province